Alan Turing (1912–1954), a pioneer computer scientist, mathematician, and philosopher, is the eponym of all of the things (and topics) listed below.
Alan Turing Building, Manchester, England
Turing School/house Varndean School Brighton,England
The Turing School, Eastbourne, England
Alan Turing Centenary Conference, Manchester, England
Alan Turing Institute, London, England
Alan Turing law
Alan Turing Memorial, Manchester, England
Alan Turing sculpture, Eugene, Oregon, United States
Alan Turing statue, Bletchley Park, England
Alan Turing: The Enigma
Alan Turing Year
The Annotated Turing
Church–Turing thesis
Church–Turing–Deutsch principle
Good–Turing frequency estimation
Object-Oriented Turing (programming language)
Super-Turing computation
Turing-acceptable language
Turing Award
Turing (cipher)
Turing College, Kent, England
Turing completeness
Turing computability
Turing degree
Turing Foundation, Amsterdam, Netherlands
Turing Gateway to Mathematics, Cambridge, England
The Turing Guide
Turing House School
Turing Institute, Glasgow, Scotland
Turing jump
Turing Lecture
Turing machine
Alternating Turing machine
Multi-track Turing machine
Multitape Turing machine
Neural Turing machine
Non-deterministic Turing machine
Post–Turing machine
Probabilistic Turing machine
Quantum Turing machine
Read-only right moving Turing machines
Read-only Turing machine
Symmetric Turing machine
Unambiguous Turing machine
Universal Turing machine
Wolfram's 2-state 3-symbol Turing machine
Turing Machine (band)
Turing (microarchitecture)
Turing OS
Turing pattern
Turing Pharmaceuticals
Turing (programming language)
Turing reduction
Turing Robot, China
Turing scheme
Turing Street - A road in East London
Turing switch
Turing table
Turing tarpit
Turing test
Computer game bot Turing Test
Graphics Turing Test
Reverse Turing test
Subject matter expert Turing test
Visual Turing Test
The Turing Test (novel)
The Turing Test (video game)
The Turing Trust
Turing from 2064: Read Only Memories (video game)
Turing's method
Turing's proof
Turing's Wager
Turing+ (programming language)
Turing.jl (probabilistic programming)
Turingery
Turingismus
Turmite
Turochamp

See also
Bank of England £50 note (in 2021)
Turing baronetcy
Turing (disambiguation)

References

Turing, Alan
Turing, Alan
Things named after Alan Turing